Esther Eden Fernandes is an Indian singer-songwriter based in Dubai, United Arab Emirates. She rose to fame in 2014 when singer Jessie J invited her to perform at her concert at the Red Fest DXB. In 2016, as an independent artist she premiered her debut single "Phoenix".

Personal life
Eden was born in Goa, India and moved to the UAE when she was 7 months old and has lived there ever since. She pursued BA in songwriting at BIMM, Berlin.

Career
In 2014, British Songstress Jessie J visited Al Diyafah High School where Esther Eden was studying in and watched Eden perform an original song. She then invited Eden to perform at her concert at the Red Fest DXB and within a few hours Eden was performing for a crowd of over 10,000 people. Eden was invited to participate in the pilot series of "Inspired" created by White Cube Studios Abu Dhabi. Eden was also invited to speak for a TedX event in Dubai, where she spoke about how music can help a student.

Her music got the attention of the major music label Universal Music MENA and on 5 November 2015, Eden signed a recording contract with UMM. Jessie J even tweeted to the young teen saying 'how proud she was'

Eden went on to perform for the Red Fest DXB in February 2016 in her own strength as an independent artist and premiered her debut single "Phoenix" for a crowd of around 15,000 people, and alongside Fifth Harmony, LMFAO, Trey Songz and Adam Lambert. Phoenix was subsequently released in February 2016, produced by Joshua Williams. She was part of the Red Bull Bass camp in Feb 2016.

The song that Eden performed for Jessie J was released in May 2016 and was titled "Is this love" which hit the UK Music Week charts. The music video was released in August 2016. This song was produced by White Cube Studios, Abu Dhabi. Her next single 'Here we go' was released on 28 October 2016 which was a collaboration with Shaun Warner. She went on to perform for the Beats on the Beach 2016, alongside Big Sean and Sean Paul.

Eden has been nominated for an award in the "Young Achiever" category for the Emirates Woman 'Woman Of The Year' Awards 2016.

She performed for Step Music Fest with other regional acts in April 2017. Eden was named the Brand Ambassador for Sennheiser in the Middle East in March 2017. Eden's next single 'Blue Case' was released in 2018.

Discography

Singles
"Phoenix" (25 February 2016)
"Is this love" (12 May 2016)
"Here we go" (28 October 2016)
"BitterSweet" Love" (30 June 2017)
"Blue Case" (2018)
"Calm before the Storm" (2019)
"My Own Way" (2019)
"Easy" (2019)

Album
Solitaire (18 November 2016)- Universal Music MENA
My Own Way (2020)- Universal Music MENA

References

External links 

Esther Eden on Facebook
Esther Eden on Twitter
Esther Eden on Instagram
Esther Eden on Youtube

1997 births
Living people
Singers from Goa
Women musicians from Goa
Musicians from Dubai
Indian women singer-songwriters
Indian women pop singers
Indian women jazz singers
Indian emigrants to the United Arab Emirates
Indian expatriates in the United Arab Emirates
21st-century Indian women singers
21st-century Indian singers